Richard Kitzbichler (born 12 January 1974) is an Austrian former professional footballer who played as a midfielder.

Club career
Kitzbichler was born in Wörgl, Tyrol. He started his career in 1992 with FC Wacker Innsbruck in the Austrian Bundesliga. In 1997, he signed a contract with SV Austria Salzburg and stayed there until 2002. He spent one season with Hamburger SV in the German Bundesliga, and then returned to Austria. From 2003 he played for FK Austria Wien, until 2005 when he joined Australian A-League club Melbourne Victory. After a highly successful 2005, the popular Kitzbichler agreed to return to the club he left in 2002 to take up a playing and coaching role. In January 2006, Kitzbichler accepted a transfer back to his former club of Salzburg (now known as Red Bull Salzburg due to a corporate takeover), thus ending his time as one of the pioneering members of the new Melbourne football club. He helped Red Bull Salzburg's amateur side, Red Bull Salzburg II, achieve promotion from the Austrian Regionalliga West to the Second Division of the Bundesliga. He retired from active football in May 2009.

International career
Kitzbichler made his debut for Austria in April 1996 against Hungary but was ignored for the 1998 FIFA World Cup. He earned 17 caps, no goals scored. His last international was a May 2002 friendly match against Germany.

Coaching career
Kitzbichler was member of the coaching staff of FC Red Bull Salzburg where he worked as video analyst, and for a couple of month as assistant coach.

In 2017 Roger Schmidt brought Kitzbichler to Beijing.

In August 2019, he was announced as first team assistant coach of Premier League club Southampton, working alongside .

Career statistics

Honours
Austria Wien
 Austrian Cup: 2004–05
 Austrian Supercup: 2004

Austria Salzburg
 Austrian Supercup: 1997

References

External links

 Richard Kitzbichler recalls his Victory days
 Kitzbichler: That's how it is in the realm of means
 Richard Kitzbichler at Austria Archiv 
 
 

1974 births
Living people
People from Kufstein District
Austrian footballers
Austria international footballers
FC Wacker Innsbruck players
FC Red Bull Salzburg players
Hamburger SV players
FK Austria Wien players
Melbourne Victory FC players
Austrian Football Bundesliga players
Bundesliga players
A-League Men players
Austrian expatriate footballers
Austrian expatriate sportspeople in Germany
Austrian expatriate sportspeople in Australia
Expatriate footballers in Germany
Expatriate soccer players in Australia
Association football midfielders
Footballers from Tyrol (state)
Southampton F.C. non-playing staff
Beijing Guoan F.C. non-playing staff
FC Tirol Innsbruck players
Austrian expatriate sportspeople in China
Austrian expatriate sportspeople in England